Hellebore Lake is a lake on Vancouver Island which is the expansion of Marblerock Creek.

References

Alberni Valley
Lakes of Vancouver Island
Nootka Land District